Glyptorhagada is a genus of air-breathing land snails, terrestrial pulmonate gastropod mollusks in the family Camaenidae.

Species 
Species within the genus Glyptorhagada include:
 Glyptorhagada bordaensis
 Glyptorhagada euglypta
 Glyptorhagada janaslini
 Glyptorhagada kooringensis
 Glyptorhagada silveri
 Glyptorhagada tattawuppana

References 

 Nomenclator Zoologicus info

 
Camaenidae
Taxa named by Henry Augustus Pilsbry
Gastropod genera
Taxonomy articles created by Polbot